The Church of St Peter and St Paul is a Church of England parish church in Wantage, Oxfordshire. The church is a grade I listed building.

History
The earliest parts of the church date to the late 13th century. In the 15th century, the chancel was extended, and chapels
and aisles were added.

In 1857, during the Victorian restoration, the church was restored by George Edmund Street. In 1877, the church was extended to the west by William Butterfield with an addition of one bay. The south chapel was restored in 1895, "in thankful memory of W. J. Butler, 34 years vicar".

On 22 April 1950, the church was designated a Grade I listed building.

Present day
The Church of England parish of Wantage is in the Archdeaconry of Dorchester of the Diocese of Oxford. The parish stands in the Catholic tradition of the Church of England.

Notable clergy

 William John Butler, later Dean of Lincoln, was vicar from 1847 to 1881
 Roscow Shedden, former Bishop of Nassau, was vicar from 1931 to 1952
 Robert Wright, later Chaplain to the Speaker of the House of Commons, was priest-in-charge (1978–1984) and vicar (1987–1992)

Gallery

References

External links

 Parish website
 A Church Near You entry

Saint Peter and Saint Paul
13th-century church buildings in England
Church of England church buildings in Oxfordshire
Grade I listed churches in Oxfordshire
Anglo-Catholic church buildings in Oxfordshire